The Unusual is the second album by Artifacts member El Da Sensei.  It was released on February 28, 2006 under Fat Beats Records.

Background
Tame and El's graf-rap was well received by underground audiences and continued in the New Jersey rap tradition of Redman and Lords of the Underground.  The group developed a fan base of hardcore hip-hoppers, being graffiti artists and hip-hop purists.  El Da Sensei latest album is a continuation of the first two Artifacts albums.  According to El, the album "stands for true hip hop."

El has said that the possibility of an Artifacts reunion are low, considering the relative success he and Tame One have had since both going solo.

Reception
Reviews were very positive, considering the El's lengthy hiatus: PopMatters says: "He manages to present his album with intelligent proportions, and like a fine wine, he will only get better with time."

Track listing

References

2006 albums
El Da Sensei albums
Albums produced by K-Def
Albums produced by J. Rawls
Albums produced by Jake One